2017 was the 6th year in the history of RXF, the largest mixed martial arts promotion based in Romania.

List of events

RXF 26

RXF 26: Brașov was a mixed martial arts event that took place on April 25, 2017, at the Dumitru Popescu Arena in Brașov, Romania.

Results

RXF 27

RXF 27: Next Fighter was a mixed martial arts event that took place on July 29, 2017, at the Sala Polivalentă in Piatra Neamț, Romania.

Results

RXF 28

RXF 28: VIP Special Edition was a mixed martial arts event that took place on October 30, 2017, at the Lux Divina in Brașov, Romania.

Results

RXF 29

RXF 29: All Stars (also known as RXF vs. Magnum FC) was a mixed martial arts event that took place on December 18, 2017, at the Lux Divina in Brașov, Romania.

Results

See also 
 2017 in Romanian kickboxing

References

External links
RXF
 

2017 in mixed martial arts
Real Xtreme Fighting events